4-Ethylmethcathinone (4-EMC) is a recreational designer drug of the stimulant and entactogen class. It is a structural isomer of 4-MEC and 3,4-DMMC. It has been identified in many countries around the world, initially in Europe but was first found in Australia in 2020.

Legal status 

In the United States 4-EMC is considered a schedule 1 controlled substance as a positional isomer of 4-Methylethcathinone (4-MEC) 

4-Ethylmethcathinone is a controlled substance in the US state of Vermont . It is also covered by analogue provisions in many other jurisdictions.

See also 
 4-Ethylamphetamine
 4-Et-PVP
 RTI-83

References 

Cathinones
Designer drugs
Entactogens and empathogens